Beta Sigma Tau was a social fraternity founded at Roosevelt University in . In , most of its active chapters were absorbed into Pi Lambda Phi fraternity.

Beta Sigma Tau was known for being a fraternity "open to all Races and Religions".

History
In , twelve Intercultural fraternities, with a total of sixteen chapters from New York to California, met in a convention at Roosevelt University and drew up the constitution and structure of a new national, intercultural fraternity, Beta Sigma Tau.  In , the groups met again and completed the organization of Beta Sigma Tau.

The founder of Beta Sigma Tau was Stanley Tolliver, of Baldwin Wallace College.

Two chapters reverted to local status, and later joined other national fraternities.

Characteristics
According to its Constitutional Preamble, Beta Sigma Tau was founded "...to level, not raise barriers among people", and to have a foundation based "upon a brotherhood and democracy which transcends racial, national, and religious differences".

Chapters
Beta Sigma Tau chapters included the following chapters.  It appears Beta Sigma Tau chapters did not use Greek letter designations. Those active at the time of the merger are noted in bold, inactive chapters noted in italics.

Some sources indicate that there may have been a Beta Sigma Tau colony or chapter at Stanford University.

But this organization had no legal connection to Beta Sigma Tau national, nor to Pi Lambda Phi. By  the Toledo group "swayed from its multicultural mission and folded as its founders and core leaders graduated."

Notes

See also
 Beta Sigma Rho
 Phi Beta Delta
 Pi Lambda Phi

References

Pi Lambda Phi
Student organizations established in 1948
1948 establishments in Illinois